Monitor-E was the first Russian satellite of a fleet of newly designed, small Earth observing satellites.

The satellite was decommissioned 21 January 2008 and decayed from orbit 22 September 2020.

Design 
Monitor-E had a set of remote sensing devices. They were intended to make maps of the Earth's surface to be used for ecological monitoring and charting geological features. It was built by the Khrunichev State Research and Production Space Center.

A mock-up of Monitor-E (COSPAR 2003-031A) was launched 30 June 2003 aboard Rokot rocket.

Specifications 

Sensors
 8 m panchromatic (0.51-0.85 µm), swath width of not less 90 km
 20–40 m multispectral (0.54-0.59/0.63-0.68/0.79-0.90 µm), swath width of not less than 160 km

Onboard storage
2 × 200 gigabit capacity

Data communications
Transmission speeds of 15.36/61.44/122.88  Mbit/s

Orbit
Altitude:  - 97.6 degree Sun-synchronous inclination

Spacecraft
Planned active life: 5 years
Orientation precision: 0.1 degrees
Stabilization precision: 0.001 degrees/s
Average daily power consumption: 450 W
Mass:

Communications problems 
After launch, communications with Monitor-E was initially difficult to establish, but a few hours later it was successfully contacted and control was established. On 19 October 2005 new problems developed and no communication was possible since then. Later on communications were restored and photographs from both cameras were published on 30 November 2005.

References

External links 

Monitor-E site by NTs OMZ

Reconnaissance satellites of Russia
Derelict satellites orbiting Earth
Satellites using the Yakhta bus
Spacecraft launched by Rokot rockets
Spacecraft launched in 2005
Roscosmos